Nedungadu, formerly Nédouncadou, is a town and commune in the Karaikal District of Puducherry, India. It is known for Nedungadu Tantondresswara temple, which is under an archaeological survey of India protectorate.

Demography 

According to the 2001 census, Nedungadu had a population of 15,406 with 7,573 men and 7,833 women. The female:male sex ratio was 1034:1000.

References 

 

Cities and towns in Karaikal district